Geashill is a barony in County Offaly (formerly King's County), Republic of Ireland.

Etymology
The name Geashill is from the village of Geashill (Irish Géisill, "place of swans").

Location

Geashill barony is located in central County Offaly, south of the Grand Canal. The Tullamore River and Clodiagh River flow through it, and it contains the Hawkswood Bog Natural Heritage Area.

History
Geashill is roughly formed from the ancient Túath Géisille of the Uí Failge septs of Leinster. As Viscount Clanmalier the Ó Diummasach (O'Dempsey) held part of this barony, where the main castle of the clan was located. The Ó hAimherigin (O'Bergin) sept are noted as chiefs in this barony in medieval times.

List of settlements

Below is a list of settlements in Geashill barony:
Ballinagar
Geashill
Killeigh

References

Baronies of County Offaly